Below is a table containing the twenty tallest buildings in the state of Alabama. The tallest building in the state is the RSA Battle House Tower, which was completed in 2007. The list includes ten in Birmingham, five in Mobile, and two or less in any other city.

Tallest buildings
 The Poarch Band of Creek Indians own and operate two high rise hotels on tribal land in Alabama located in Wetumpka and Atmore. They are not included in this list despite the fact their height surpasses other listings.

See also
List of tallest buildings in Birmingham, Alabama
List of tallest buildings in Mobile, Alabama

References

Birmingham- Emporis.com
Mobile- Emporis.com
Montgomery- Emporis.com
Huntsville- Emporis.com
Orange Beach- Emporis.com

Skyscrapers in Alabama
Alabama
Tallest